Broxtowe is a local government district with borough status in Nottinghamshire, England, west of the City of Nottingham. The population of the district as taken at the 2011 Census was 109,487.  It is part of the Nottingham Urban Area. Broxtowe's neighbour to the west is the borough of Erewash, which is in Derbyshire.

Settlements

Settlements include Beeston—where the council is based—Attenborough, Awsworth, Bramcote, Brinsley, Chilwell, Cossall, Eastwood, Giltbrook, Greasley, Kimberley, Moorgreen, Newthorpe, Nuthall, Stapleford, Strelley, Swingate, Toton, Trowell and Watnall. Additionally a small part of Wollaton falls within Broxtowe.

The Broxtowe Estate is not within the borough, but within the boundaries of the City of Nottingham.

Civil parishes
Broxtowe has ten civil parishes of which three (Eastwood, Kimberley and Stapleford) have town councils. The unparished area of the borough covers the town of Beeston and the neighbouring places of Chilwell, Toton, Attenborough and Bramcote—this is the area of the former Beeston and Stapleford Urban District, minus Stapleford which was parished in 1987.

Formation

The district was formed on 1 April 1974 by a merger of the Beeston and Stapleford urban district, the Eastwood urban district and part of Basford Rural District. The borough's name was derived from the old Broxtowe wapentake of Nottinghamshire, which covered a larger area.

The district was granted borough status in 1977.

Politics

The first elections to the council took place in 1973, with the Conservatives gaining control. The party held power until 1995 when it lost control to the Labour party. From 2003 no party had overall control. After the 2009 elections the Liberal Democrats led the council with Labour support. Following the 2011 elections Labour led the council with Liberal Democrat support, but the Conservatives had the largest representation on the council. In the 2015 elections the Conservatives gained a majority.

Wards
Since boundary changes in 2015, 44 councillors have been elected from 20 wards. Each ward returns one to three councillors to the Borough Council, depending on the ward's electorate/population. Below is a summary list of the 20 wards and the number of councillors they each elect in brackets.

Attenborough and Chilwell East (3) †
Awsworth Cossall and Trowell(2)
Beeston Central (2) †
Beeston North (2) † – includes a very small part of Wollaton
Beeston Rylands (2) †
Beeston West (2) †
Bramcote (3) † – includes a small part of Wollaton
Brinsley (1)
Chilwell West (3) †
Eastwood Hall (1)
Eastwood Hill Top (2)
Eastwood St Mary's (2)
Greasley (3)
Kimberley (3)
Nuthall East & Strelley (2)
(Watnall) & Nuthall West (2)
Stapleford North (2)
Stapleford South East (2)
Stapleford South West (2)
Toton & Chilwell Meadows (3) †

† These wards form the unparished area of the borough.

Parliamentary constituency

Since 1983 Broxtowe has also been a parliamentary constituency. The constituency boundaries do not exactly match the borough boundaries, with some wards of Broxtowe borough (Brinsley, Eastwood North and Greasley (Beauvale), and Eastwood South) being in the Ashfield constituency. The elections in the constituency have returned the following MPs:
1992 Sir Jim Lester (Conservative)
1997 Nick Palmer (Labour)
2001 Nick Palmer (Labour)
2005 Nick Palmer (Labour)
2010 Anna Soubry (Conservative)
2015 Anna Soubry (Conservative)
2017 Anna Soubry (Conservative / The Independent Group)
2019 Darren Henry (Conservative)

A Broxtowe constituency also existed from 1918 to 1970. The area of the former constituency was very different, including Hucknall and Kirkby in Ashfield, but excluding Beeston.

Twinning

Broxtowe is twinned with Gütersloh in Germany.

Local attractions 
Broxtowe's main attraction that receives visitors from all over the world is D.H. Lawrence Heritage in Eastwood.
A small local attraction is the Hemlock Stone in Stapleford.  Broxtowe is also the location of the Attenborough Nature Reserve rated as one of the most popular nature reserves in the UK. Its visitor centre was opened by David Attenborough in March 2005. Sir David can trace his family back to the village of Attenborough located to the east of the visitor centre.

Local Nature Reserves

Broxtowe has 13 designated Local Nature Reserves, namely Alexandrina Plantation (Bramcote), Bramcote Park Woodland (Bramcote), Brinsley Headstocks (Brinsley), Hall Om Wong (Kimberley), King George's Park (Bramcote), Nottingham Canal, Sandy Lane Public Open Space (Bramcote), Smithurst Meadows (Giltbrook), Stapleford Hill Woodland (Stapleford), Toton Fields (Toton), Watnall Spinney and Watnall Green (Watnall), and Colliers Wood (Moorgreen).

Arms

Freedom of the Borough
The following people and military units have received the Freedom of the Borough of Broxtowe.

Individuals
 Professor Sir Martyn Poliakoff : 17 November 2022.

Military Units
 170 (Infrastructure Support) Engineer Group Royal Engineers: 2010.

References

 
Non-metropolitan districts of Nottinghamshire
Boroughs in England